Last Vegas is a 2013 American comedy film directed by Jon Turteltaub, written by Dan Fogelman and starring Michael Douglas, Robert De Niro, Morgan Freeman, Kevin Kline and Mary Steenburgen. Three retirees travel to Las Vegas to have a bachelor party for their last remaining single friend.

The film was released to theaters on 1 November 2013, by CBS Films.

Plot 

Four childhood friends from Brooklyn - Sam, Archie, Paddy, and Billy - are now older. Sam and his wife Miriam live in Naples. Archie, a twice-divorced Vietnam veteran, lives in New Jersey. Paddy lives alone in his Brooklyn apartment, bitter since the death of his beloved wife, Sophie. Billy is a successful entrepreneur in Malibu, who lives with his 31-year-old girlfriend Lisa. Shortly after proposing to Lisa (at a funeral), Billy finds an old bottle of scotch he and his friends stole in their childhood days, and calls Sam and Archie, who immediately propose a bachelor party for Billy in Las Vegas. After being given permission by Miriam to cheat on her, Sam collects Archie, whose ongoing health issues cause his son to be concerned. They convince a reluctant Paddy to join them and they fly off to rendezvous with Billy in Vegas.

Billy and Paddy get into a heated argument about Billy's failure to attend Sophie's funeral. They head to Binion's but the hotel is closed for renovations. They visit the Aria where the wedding will be held, and are attracted to the lounge by the singing of Diana. The five share a drink, and they convince Diana to join them for festivities.

While waiting to get rooms, Archie goes to a blackjack table and buys $15,000 worth of chips with his pension money. When Paddy and Sam return, they find that Archie is up $102,000. They quickly leave the table in fear of being accused of card counting. Billy tours the wedding chapel with Diana, and becomes smitten by her. The quartet later become judges of a swimsuit competition. They are then confronted by the casino manager, who offers to compensate the group with his largest penthouse suite in hopes that Archie will stay and spend his winnings at the hotel. Billy suggests they open the old bottle of scotch to celebrate, but Paddy storms off. That night, the remaining three go to the hotel's nightclub where they enjoy a night of drinking and dancing. Sam meets a young maid of honour from a bachelorette party who expresses her attraction for him.

The following day, while the others are recovering, Paddy visits Diana and tells her that he and Billy were both in love with Sophie when they were younger and she picked Paddy. Diana tries to convince him to stop grieving and move on with life because Sophie would want it. Paddy joins Billy at their pool cabana and admits he needs to move on from Sophie's passing while also being upset with Billy for marrying a woman he does not truly love. Sam and Archie decide to throw a massive bachelor party for Billy in their suite that night. They prepare for the party and invite several people including a bachelorette party from the nightclub, exotic dancers, a band of drag queens, and cast members of Zarkana.

Billy visits Diana. She admits that she is fond of him, and asks if he truly loves Lisa. As they walk along The Strip, Billy tells Diana that Paddy gave Sophie an ultimatum to choose either Billy or him, and she secretly chose Billy first; but Billy told Sophie that she was meant to be with Paddy.

Paddy tells Billy he invited Diana to the party because he likes her and wants to start anew after Sophie's passing, but realizes Billy likes her too. When Diana arrives, Billy pushes Paddy into the pool, and takes Diana upstairs to tell her to give Paddy a chance. She says she feels like she is being treated like Sophie, and "gifted" by Billy to Paddy, which Paddy overhears. Paddy is devastated to learn this and throws the old bottle of scotch in the trash as he leaves the party. Meanwhile, Sam prepares to cheat on his wife with the young maid of honour but cannot bring himself to do it.

The next morning, Paddy confronts Billy at the pool. He informs him that no one could tell Sophie who to love, and that they shared a beautiful life together. He tells Billy to call off the wedding. As Lisa and her bridesmaids arrive, Paddy pushes Billy into the pool and tells Lisa that Billy is calling off the wedding.

Billy and Lisa talk it out and Lisa leaves. Billy comes to terms with his age and admits his fear of getting old and being alone. They come together as friends again, and tell Billy to go see Diana. Billy goes to the lounge where Diana is singing and reveals his feelings for her. The guys finally decide to crack open the old bottle of scotch for a toast, however to their surprise, all but Paddy find the taste to be repulsive.

A few months later, Billy and Diana call Archie and Paddy to announce they are getting married. They try to call Sam but he is unable to answer the phone as he is busy in bed with his wife.

Cast 

 Michael Douglas as Billy Gerson
 Robert De Niro as Patrick "Paddy" Connors
 Morgan Freeman as Archibald "Archie" Clayton
 Kevin Kline as Sam Harris
 Mary Steenburgen as Diana Boyle
 Jerry Ferrara as Dean
 Romany Malco as Lonnie
 Roger Bart as Maurice
 Joanna Gleason as Miriam Harris
 Michael Ealy as Ezra Clayton
 Bre Blair as Lisa
 Ashley Spillers as Elizabeth
 April Billingsley as Bachelorette's Maid of Honor
 Andrea Moore as Bachelorette
 Redfoo as himself
 50 Cent as himself (cameo)

Production 
Early in development, Jack Nicholson was attached to the project.

Principal photography started in November 2012 in Las Vegas. At the end of November, filming moved to the Atlanta, Georgia, area.

Reception

Critical response
On Rotten Tomatoes the film has an approval rating of 46% based on reviews from 146 critics, with an average score of 5.18/10. The sites consensus states: "The cast of Last Vegas keep things amiably watchable, but the film is mostly a mellower Hangover retread for the older set." On Metacritic, the film has a score of 48 out of 100, based on 34 reviews, indicating "mixed or average reviews". Audiences surveyed by CinemaScore gave the film a grade A-, on a scale from A to F.

Scott Foundas of Variety wrote: "A smattering of funny gags and the nostalgia value of the cast — none of whom, curiously, have ever shared the screen before — keeps the whole thing more watchable than it has any right to be." Foundas calls the film a clone of The Hangover and praises Mary Steenburgen for her performance but says "The rest of the movie rarely if ever rises to Steenburgen’s level."
Ignatiy Vishnevetsky of The A.V. Club gave the film a grade D- and wrote: "The high point of Last Vegas is also arguably the low point of Robert De Niro’s career."

Box office 
Last Vegas grossed $16,334,566 in its opening weekend in the US from 3,065 theaters, averaging $5,329 per theater and ranking #3 for the weekend. The film closed on February 20, 2014, with a worldwide final gross of $134,402,450, making it CBS Films' highest-grossing movie to date.

Home media 
Last Vegas was released on DVD and Blu-ray on 28 January 2014.

Soundtrack 
The soundtrack to Last Vegas was released on 29 October 2013.

See also
 List of films set in Las Vegas

References

External links 
 
 
 
 

2013 films
2010s buddy comedy films
American buddy comedy films
CBS Films films
Universal Pictures films
2010s English-language films
Films about old age
Films directed by Jon Turteltaub
Films set in 1955
Films set in Florida
Films set in the Las Vegas Valley
Films set in Los Angeles
Films set in New Jersey
Films set in New York City
Films shot in Atlanta
Films shot in the Las Vegas Valley
Films scored by Mark Mothersbaugh
Films produced by Laurence Mark
Films with screenplays by Dan Fogelman
Midlife crisis films
2013 comedy films
2010s American films